San José de Mayo is the capital city of the San José Department in southern Uruguay.

Geography
The city is located at the centre of the state, on the intersection of Route 3 with Route 11,  from the centre of Montevideo. The railroad track connecting Montevideo with Colonia and with the northwest of the country passes through the city. The river Río San José flows along the northeastern and eastern limits of the city.

History

San José de Mayo was founded on 1 July 1783. It had acquired "Villa" (town) status before the Independence of Uruguay, which was elevated to "Ciudad" (city) on 12 July 1856 by the Act of Ley Nº 495. During the 19th century it became a commercial and cultural centre, known as "Montevideo chico" ("little Montevideo"). The theatre "Teatro Macció" was constructed at the turn of the 20th century.

Population
In 2011 San José de Mayo had a population of 36,743.
 
Source: Instituto Nacional de Estadística de Uruguay

Places of worship
 Cathedral Basilica and National Sanctuary of St. Joseph (Roman Catholic)
 Our Lady of the Rosary of Pompei Parish Church (Roman Catholic)
 Our Lady of Fatima Parish Church (Roman Catholic)
 Our Lady of the Orchard Chapel (Roman Catholic)

Economy

Besides being the administrative capital of the department, the city is an active regional commercial and financial centre. Its economy is linked mainly to cattle ranching, and it is an agro-industrial centre for dairy products, packing houses, mills, and chemicals.

References

External links

INE map of San José de Mayo

Populated places in the San José Department
Populated places established in 1783